Mechnikov ( Mečnikov,  Mechnykov, Mečnykov; Metchnikov)
 Ilya Ilyich Mechnikov
 I. I. Mechnikov Odessa National University
 Mechnikov (crater), an impact crater on the far side of the Moon

Ukrainian families
Russian-language surnames